The KBS Cup is a South Korean Go competition.

Outline
The KBS Cup is sponsored by KBS. From 1980 to 2003, the tournament was named the KBS Baduk Wang, but was recently renamed to the KBS Cup. The main tournament consists of 16 players who compete in a knockout tournament. There is a winner's and a loser's round to decide the challenger. The thinking time is 5 minutes with byo-yomi.

Formerly, the final was a best-of-3 match. In 2023, the final match was a single game.

It is broadcast live by KBS 1TV.

Past winners

Final Results

References

External links
  
 Korea Baduk Association (in Korean)
 Sensei's Library page
 Igo Kisen's recent years full results

Go competitions in South Korea
Korean Broadcasting System